Thompson Samkange (1893–1956) was a major figure in the history of Rhodesian/Zimbabwean independence. He led the African National Council in 1945, and was one of the founders of the Bantu National Congress.

He was the father of Zimbabwean historical novelist Stanlake Samkange.

References

1893 births
1956 deaths
Rhodesian politicians